Santa Brigida was a frigate of the Spanish Navy, launched in 1785. The British Royal Navy captured her in 1799. She then became the East Indiaman Automatia (or Automasia, or Automation), and made one voyage for the British East India Company (EIC). She was sold for breaking up in 1803.

Capture
Santa Brigida and Thetis left Vera Cruz (Mexico) on 21 August 1799. Santa Brigada was under the command of Captain Don Antonio Pillon. She was carrying a cargo of drugs, annatto, cochineal, indigo and sugar, and some 1,500,000 Spanish dollars (£313,000). Thetis was under the command of Captain Don Juan de Mendoza and carried a cargo of cocoa, cochineal and sugar, and more importantly, specie worth 1,385,292 Spanish dollars (£312,000).

On 16 October they encountered several British frigates in position .  captured Thetis. Santa Brigida had two men killed and eight men wounded. Prize money was paid on 14 January 1800.
 
The British considered neither vessel eligible for the Royal Navy. Their "chief and almost only value rested in the cargo they carried."

Merchantman
Prinsep and Saunders purchased Santa Brigida, converted her into an East Indiaman, and renamed her Automatia (or Automasia, or Automation).

Automatia appears in the Register of Shipping for 1802 with S. Cortis, master, R. Heater, owner, and trade Plymouth-Calcutta. Captain Anthony Curtis (or Cortis), acquired a letter of marque on 8 December 1800. Messrs. Princip and Saunders had tendered Automasia, Anthony Curtis, master, to the EIC to bring back rice from Bengal. She was one of 28 vessels that sailed on that mission between December 1800 and February 1801.

Curtis sailed from Plymouth on 25 December, bound for Madras and Bengal. However, on 30 December a violent squall of the Lizard carried away Automatias mast;  towed her to Falmouth. On 7 March she passed Plymouth as she sailed from Torbay to Calcutta for rice.

Automatia arrived at Madras on 23 June 1801, and Calcutta on 5 July. On 1 September she reported that she had almost completed loading her rice and that she expected to sail for Europe in a few days. Homeward bound, she was at Kedgeree on 22 September, and left there on 5 October.

On 19 October Automasia recaptured from the French the snow Friendship,  Vizagapatam. Lloyd's List reported on 16 March 1802 that Automasia, Curtis, master, had recaptured Friendship, Topham, master. Friendship had been sailing from Negapatam to Madras with "bale goods". Automasia sent her into Calcutta.

Automatia reached the Cape of Good Hope on 19 December. She left on 3 January 1802 and arrived at the Downs on 13 March.

Fate
On her return from India Automatia underwent a survey preparatory to making another voyage. She was found unfit for further service and was sold in 1803 for breaking up.

The Register of Shipping continues to carry Automatia to 1805, but all data is stale. Lloyd's Register does not appear ever to have carried her.

Notes

Citations

References
Fisher, Anne (1788) An accurate new spelling dictionary, and expositor of the English language ... The sixth edition, much improved
 
 
Hydrographic Office, Admiralty (1904) Islands in the Southern Indian Ocean, Westward of Longitude 80° East: Including Madagascar.
 

1785 ships
Frigates of the Spanish Navy
Ships built in Cartagena, Spain
Captured ships
Ships of the British East India Company
Age of Sail merchant ships of England